A yanggwan is a ceremonial hat worn by Korean officials during events such as a wedding ceremony, prayer ceremony like that practiced on Chuseok, and other ceremonies. It is considered a crown. It is usually worn when "court dress" (朝服) is required for Korean officials.

See also
List of Korean Clothing
Korean culture

References

Korean headgear
Hats